Van Opstal is a Dutch/Flemish surname. Bearers of the name include:

Arnold Van Opstal, a Filipino-German professional basketball player
Gaspar Jacob van Opstal the Younger (1654-1717), a Flemish painter 
Gerard van Opstal (1594 or 1597–1668), a Flemish Baroque sculptor
Henri van Opstal (born 20 February 1989), a Dutch kickboxer

Dutch-language surnames